Gregoria Mariska Tunjung Cahyaningsih (born 11 August 1999) is an Indonesian badminton player who plays in the singles event. Her club is PB. Mutiara Cardinal in Bandung, West Java, and entered the national team in 2013. She won the girls' singles title at the 2017 World Junior Championships. Tunjung also featured in the Indonesian women's winning team at the 2022 Asia Team Championships.

Career
In 2014, Tunjung reached the final of the Malaysia International. En route to the final, she had to start from the qualifying round, then beat the first seed Aprilia Yuswandari. Unfortunately, in the final round she was defeated by Chen Jiayuan in straight game. In 2015, at the age of 16, Tunjung has won a BWF International Series title in Singapore defeating host player Yeo Jia Min in the final. She later won an International Challenge at the Indonesia International held in Surabaya.

In 2016, Tunjung won the silver medal in the girls' singles event at the Asian Junior Championships.

Tunjung opened the 2017 season by reaching the final of the BWF Grand Prix in the Syed Modi International. Ranked as World number 120, Tunjung finished as runner-up after defeated by P. V. Sindhu the first seed and 2016 Olympic silver medalists. She also finished runner-up to Kisona Selvaduray at the Indonesia International Series. In August, Tunjung won the bronze medals at the South East Asian Games in the women's singles and team event. In October, Tunjung becomes the first Indonesian in 25 years to win the World Junior Championship girls' singles title.

In 2018, Tunjung won the women's singles title at the Finnish Open beating her compatriot Ruselli Hartawan in the final.

In 2019, Tunjung helps Indonesia women's team won the silver medal at the Southeast Asian Games.

In 2022, Tunjung won bronze in the women's singles at the 2021 Southeast Asian Games, while in the team event, she helps to captured the silver medal. She then reached her first finals in the BWF World Tour event in the 2022 Australian Open. In the final, she lost to An Se-young in straight games. She competed in the season ending tournament the 2022 BWF World Tour Finals, and beating the reigning Olympic champion, Chen Yufei, but lost to An Se-young and Akane Yamaguchi.

2023 
Tunjung opened the 2023 season at the Malaysia Open, but defeated in the second round to Taiwanese player Hsu Wen-chi. She also lost in the second round of India Open, this time to 2nd seed Korean player An Se-young. She competed in the home tournament, Indonesia Masters, but unfortunately lost in the quarter-finals from 8th seed Chinese player Han Yue.

In February, Tunjung join the Indonesia national badminton team to compete at the Badminton Asia Mixed Team Championships, but unfortunately the teams lost in the quarter-finals from team Korea.

Awards and nominations

Achievements

Southeast Asian Games 
Women's singles

BWF World Junior Championships 
Girls' singles

Asian Junior Championships 
Girls' singles

BWF World Tour (1 runner-up) 
The BWF World Tour, which was announced on 19 March 2017 and implemented in 2018, is a series of elite badminton tournaments sanctioned by the Badminton World Federation (BWF). The BWF World Tour is divided into levels of World Tour Finals, Super 1000, Super 750, Super 500, Super 300, and the BWF Tour Super 100.

Women's singles

BWF Grand Prix (1 runner-up) 
The BWF Grand Prix had two levels, the Grand Prix and Grand Prix Gold. It was a series of badminton tournaments sanctioned by the Badminton World Federation (BWF) and played between 2007 and 2017.

Women's singles

  BWF Grand Prix tournament
  BWF Grand Prix Gold tournament

BWF International Challenge/Series (3 titles, 2 runners-up) 
Women's singles

  BWF International Challenge tournament
  BWF International Series tournament

BWF Junior International (2 titles, 2 runners-up) 
Girls' singles

  BWF Junior International Grand Prix tournament
  BWF Junior International Challenge tournament
  BWF Junior International Series tournament
  BWF Junior Future Series tournament

Performance timeline

National team 
 Junior level

 Senior level

Individual competitions 
 Junior level

 Senior level

Record against selected opponents 
Record against year-end Finals finalists, World Championships semi finalists, and Olympic quarter finalists. Accurate as of 9 December 2022.

References 

1999 births
Living people
People from Wonogiri Regency
Sportspeople from Central Java
Indonesian female badminton players
Badminton players at the 2020 Summer Olympics
Olympic badminton players of Indonesia
Badminton players at the 2018 Asian Games
Asian Games bronze medalists for Indonesia
Asian Games medalists in badminton
Medalists at the 2018 Asian Games
Competitors at the 2015 Southeast Asian Games
Competitors at the 2017 Southeast Asian Games
Competitors at the 2019 Southeast Asian Games
Competitors at the 2021 Southeast Asian Games
Southeast Asian Games silver medalists for Indonesia
Southeast Asian Games bronze medalists for Indonesia
Southeast Asian Games medalists in badminton
21st-century Indonesian women